Corina Grünenfelder (born 29 December 1975 in Elm, Switzerland) is a Swiss former alpine skier who competed in the 2002 Winter Olympics.

External links
 sports-reference.com

1975 births
Living people
Swiss female alpine skiers
Olympic alpine skiers of Switzerland
Alpine skiers at the 2002 Winter Olympics
People from the canton of Glarus
21st-century Swiss women